Lithium selenide is an inorganic compound that formed by selenium and lithium. It is a selenide with a chemical formula Li2Se.

References 

Lithium compounds
Selenides
Fluorite crystal structure